Huang Xilian (born September 1967) is a Chinese diplomat currently serving as Chinese Ambassador to the Philippines since December 2019.

Biography
Born in September 1967, Huang graduated from Beijing Foreign Studies University and the University of Manchester. He joined the foreign service in 1989 and has served primarily in South Asia and the Department of Asian Affairs, where he was promoted to deputy head in 2014.

He was designated by the Standing Committee of the National People's Congress in January 2018 to replace  as Chinese Ambassador to the Association of Southeast Asian Nations. In December 2019, he was appointed Chinese Ambassador to the Philippines, pursuant to the National People's Congress decision, succeeding .

He wrote the lyrics for the controversial 2020 music video "Iisang Dagat".

References

1967 births
Living people
Beijing Foreign Studies University alumni
Alumni of the University of Manchester
Ambassadors of China to the Philippines
Ambassadors of China to the Association of Southeast Asian Nations